Phelipe Andrews Melo Rodrigues (born 10 August 1990) is a paralympic swimmer from Brazil competing mainly in category S10 events. He was born with a club foot and had two surgeries when he was just four weeks old. After his second surgery when his foot was in the right position he had an infection which made under his knee and specially his tendon stop to grown disabling his right foot movements so as weakness from his knee below. He started swimming when he was 8 months as physiotherapy. He also tried many different sports but his passion since a child was swimming.

First competitions
His first competitions was for "Academia Movimento" located in Olinda-PE, he competed for 4 years for his team, in 2007 he moved to João Pessoa - PB  and joined the state team C.I.E.F. where he archived regional gold medals and twice 3rd place at nationals competitions with able bodied swimmers (non-disabled).

Paralympic sports
Phelipe was part of the Brazilian team that travelled to Beijing for the 2008 Summer Paralympics. There he competed in  the 100-metre and 50-metre freestyle events where he won silver behind compatriot Andre Brasil. He also swam 400-metre freestyle where he failed to make the final, and competed as part of the Brazilian 4 × 100 m freestyle and 4 × 100 m medley teams but even with the gold and silver medal-winning S10 swimmers Brazil could not manage to win a medal finishing fourth and eighth respectively.
On his next Paralympic Game at London 2012 he archived another silver medal in the 100-metre freestyle, fourth place in the 50-metre freestyle event which gave him a medal in Beijing 2008 and fifth in the 100-metre butterfly.

He also participated in the Para-Panamerican Games in Guadalajara - Mexico in 2011 where he took 5 medals, 3 silver medals (50m,100m, 400m freestyle) and 2 gold medals (4 × 100 m freestyle and 4 × 100 m medley).

Following the 2012 Paralympics Rodrigues accepted an invitation to train in Manchester, where he stayed until the end of 2014 before returning to Brazil.

At the 2016 Rio Paralympics Rodrigues won two silver and two bronze medals.

Progression

Personal life
He is in a relationship with fellow Paralympian Liz Johnson.

References

External links

 

1990 births
Living people
Brazilian male freestyle swimmers
Brazilian male medley swimmers
Paralympic swimmers of Brazil
Paralympic silver medalists for Brazil
Paralympic bronze medalists for Brazil
Paralympic medalists in swimming
S10-classified Paralympic swimmers
Swimmers at the 2008 Summer Paralympics
Swimmers at the 2012 Summer Paralympics
Swimmers at the 2016 Summer Paralympics
Swimmers at the 2020 Summer Paralympics
Medalists at the 2008 Summer Paralympics
Medalists at the 2012 Summer Paralympics
Medalists at the 2016 Summer Paralympics
Medalists at the 2020 Summer Paralympics
Medalists at the World Para Swimming Championships
Medalists at the 2011 Parapan American Games
Medalists at the 2015 Parapan American Games
Medalists at the 2019 Parapan American Games
Sportspeople with club feet
Sportspeople from Recife
21st-century Brazilian people